Quigless may refer to:

Quigless Clinic, North Carolina
Angela T. Quigless, Missouri State judge
Helen G. Quigless, American librarian and poet